Tony Brooks may refer to:

Anthony Brooks (1922–2007), also known as Tony Brooks, British undercover agent in World War II
Tony Brooks (American football) (born 1969), American football running back
Tony Brooks-James (born 1994), American football running back
Tony Brooks (racing driver) (1932–2022), British Formula One driver
Tony Brooks (rower) (born 1950), American Olympic rower
Anthony Michael Brooks, American speed cuber

See also
Tony Brook, New Zealand rower